The 2013–14 Biathlon World Cup – Mixed Relay started at Sunday November 24, 2013 in Östersund and finished in 2014.

Competition format
The relay teams consist of four biathletes.  Legs 1 and 2 are done by the women, legs 3 and 4 by the men. The women's legs are 6 km and men's legs are 7.5 km. Every athlete's leg is skied over three laps, with two shooting rounds; one prone, one standing. For every round of five targets there are eight bullets available, though the last three can only be single-loaded manually one at a time from spare round holders or bullets deposited by the competitor into trays or onto the mat at the firing line. If after eight bullets there are still misses, one 150 m penalty loop must be taken for each missed target remaining. The first-leg participants all start at the same time, and as in cross-country skiing relays, every athlete of a team must touch the team's next-leg participant to perform a valid changeover. On the first shooting stage of the first leg, the participant must shoot in the lane corresponding to their bib number (bib #10 shoots at lane #10 regardless of their position in the race), then for the remainder of the relay, the athletes shoot at the lane in the position they arrived (arrive at the range in 5th place, shoot at lane five).

Medal winners

Standings

References

Relay
Biathlon